Robert Rygge (a.k.a. Rugge) (died 1410) was an English medieval churchman, college fellow, and university Chancellor, and archdeacon of Barnstaple in Devon.

Rygge was at Exeter College, Oxford, later a Fellow of Merton College, and four times Chancellor of the University of Oxford between 1381 and 1392. He was a Doctor of Divinity and Canon of Exeter. Rygge was later the Archdeacon of Barnstaple from 1399 to 1400.

There is some confusion about whether there was a William Rygge (or Rugge) as Chancellor of Oxford University in 1382, but it is likely that this was the same person as Robert Rygge.

References

Year of birth unknown
1410 deaths
Alumni of Exeter College, Oxford
Fellows of Merton College, Oxford
Chancellors of the University of Oxford
14th-century English Roman Catholic priests
Archdeacons of Barnstaple
15th-century English Roman Catholic priests